The Consensus Tigurinus or Consensus of Zurich was a document intended to bring unity to the Protestant churches on their doctrines of the sacraments, particularly the Lord's Supper. John Calvin, who stood in between the Lutheran view of Real Presence and the Zwinglian view of pure symbolism, wrote the first draft of the document in November 1548, with notes by Heinrich Bullinger. In the document, Calvin emphasized that there is great meaning in sacramental symbols but it does not have power to act on its own.

The document taught:

that the Sacraments are not in and of themselves effective and conferring grace, but that God, through the Holy Spirit, acts through them as means; that the internal effect appears only in the elect; that the good of the Sacraments consists in leading us to Christ, and being instruments of the grace of God, which is sincerely offered to all; that in baptism we receive the remission of sins, although this proceeds primarily not from baptism, but from the blood of Christ; that in the Lord's Supper we eat and drink the body and blood of Christ, not, however, by means of a carnal presence of Christ's human nature, which is in heaven, but by the power of the Holy Spirit and the devout elevation of our soul to  heaven.

Calvin sent the document to the Swiss churches, but the Synod at Berne opposed Calvin's view strongly and continued to do so until after Calvin's death. In May 1549, Calvin met with William Farel and Bullinger in Zurich, and the three revised the document into its final form, which was published in Zurich and Geneva in 1551. The Latin original was translated into German by Bullinger and French by Calvin.

The Consensus Tigurinus attempted to coalesce the Calvinist and the advanced Zwinglian doctrines while standing opposed to transubstantiation, the Roman Catholic view, and sacramental union, the Lutheran view. It was accepted by the churches in Zurich, Geneva,  Saint Gall, Schaffhausen, the Grisons, Neuchâtel, and eventually by Basel, and brought them into harmony with one another. It was "favorably received" in France, England, and parts of Germany, but while Melancthon said that he understood the Swiss for the first time and would no longer write against them, it was attacked by the Gnesio-Lutheran Joachim Westphal and "became the innocent occasion of the second sacramental war."

Calvin refused to answer the published attacks until these started to strain the Lutheran-Reformed relations, particularly Westphal's claim that those writing in support of the document were Sacramentarians. According to Westphal in his Farrago of Confused and Divergent Opinions on the Lord's Supper, Zwingli and Calvin were heretics since they rejected the position of the literal eating of Christ's body in the Lord's Supper.

References

External links
 Text of the 1549 Consensus with introductory commentary by Lutherans

16th-century Christian texts
Calvinist texts
1551 works
1551 in Christianity